The Arkansas Rampage was a women's football team based in Rogers, Arkansas.  The team participated in the Women's Spring Football League in 2011 and 2012.

Season-By-Season

|-
|2011 || 4 || 2 || 0 || 2nd League || --
|-
|2012 || 2 || 7 || 0 || 2nd National || Lost National Conference Championship (DFW)
|-
!Totals || 6 || 9 || 0 ||  ||

References

American football teams in Arkansas
Women's Spring Football League teams
American football teams established in 2011
American football teams disestablished in 2012
2011 establishments in Arkansas
2012 disestablishments in Arkansas
Women's sports in Arkansas
Rogers, Arkansas